The 1979–80 Rugby League Premiership was the sixth end of season Rugby League Premiership competition.

The winners were Widnes.

First round

Semi-finals

Final

References

1980 in English rugby league